Werther is a 1927 Czech silent film directed by and starring Milos Hajský. The film's art direction was by Vilém Rittershain.

Cast
 Milos Hajský as Werther
 Marta Mayrová as Lotta
 Ela Poznerová as Zofie
 Ola Hors as Max
 Frantisek Havel as Buff
 Vladimír Zidlický as Kestner
 Frantisek Adam as Kampe
 Jan Marek as Choirmaster
 Jirí Fiala

References

Bibliography
 Luboš Bartošek. Náš film: kapitoly z dějin, 1896-1945. Mladá fronta, 1985.

External links

1927 films
Czech silent films
Czech black-and-white films